The N25 Carrigtwohill-Cobh Interchange is an interchange between the N25 road (European route E30), the R624 road and the R623 road, located in Tullagreen, County Cork, Ireland. The interchange is used when coming from Cork City, Midleton, Waterford City and Rosslare.

The interchange serves Cobh using the R624 road, Carrigtwohill and Glounthaune using the R623 road. The R623 road was previously the old Cork-Midleton N25 road before the new dual carriageway from Cork to Midleton opened.

Roads in County Cork